Shannon Emerick is an American voice actress who voices a number of English language localizations of Japanese anime shows with ADV Films, Seraphim Digital and Sentai Filmworks. She graduated from Yale University with a B.A. in Theater Studies and English. In anime, she is known as the voice of Charlotte Dunois from the Infinite Stratos series, Kei Kishimoto from Gantz and Riki Naoe from the Little Busters! series. Outside of voice acting, she is a stage actress in the Houston area. She won the Best Actress award from Houston Press for her theater work twice in 2006 and 2011, respectively.

Biography
In 2017, Emerick is slated to voice Arata Wataya as a young child in Sentai Filmworks' English dub of the adaptation of Yuki Suetsugu's manga series Chihayafuru. Wataya is one of the three main characters in the series.

English dubbing roles

Animation

Video games

Awards

References

External links
 
 Shannon Emerick at Crystalacids.com
 

American stage actresses
American voice actresses
Living people
Yale University alumni
Actresses from Houston
Actresses from New York City
Actresses from New Haven, Connecticut
21st-century American actresses
American television actresses
American film actresses
Year of birth missing (living people)